Gyroporus castaneus, or commonly the chestnut bolete, is a small, white-pored relation of the Boletus mushrooms. It has a brown cap, and is usually found with oak trees. It differs from the true boletes in that the spores are a pale straw colour.

Taxonomy 
The species was described initially by the French mycologist Jean Baptiste François Pierre Bulliard (1742–1792). Formerly a member of the family Paxillaceae, research now places this mushroom in Gyroporaceae. Gyroporus means 'having round pores', and castaneus is a reference to the chestnut colouration.

Description 
The cap is from 3 to 10 cm in diameter, and pale to rusty brown in colour, which becomes darker with age. The stem is a similar colour, although it may be lighter at the apex. If the stem is cut vertically, it is usual to find several cavities of differing sizes inside. Both the cap and the stem have a tendency to crack or split in dry periods, or with age. The pores are small and white; they become dirtier with age, and are not attached to the stem. They darken slightly when pressed. The tubes are also whitish, and the spore print is pale yellow to straw. The flesh is firm, and does not change colour on cutting. The photograph on the right shows the chunkier form; a slender form also occurs.

Distribution and habitat 
The mushroom is found occasionally in Britain and throughout continental Europe, as well as eastern North America, but it is rare in western North America. It grows in small groups, or singly, in an ectomycorrhizal relationship with oaks (Quercus). It prefers acid and sandy soils, and fruits from summer to autumn. In New Zealand, it is found in association with Leptospermum. In Asia, it has been recorded from Taiwan.

Gyroporus castaneus has been included in the Moscow Oblast's and the Russian Federation's Red Book and several other countries' Red Lists, including those of Norway and Montenegro.

Edibility 
Gyroporus castaneus is edible, and highly regarded by most authors; it is said to taste pleasantly nutty when young. However, Marcel Bon, in his 1987 book The Mushrooms and Toadstools of Britain and North Western Europe, records it as suspect, so it may be worth applying caution, by eating a very small amount initially. There is also reportedly a poisonous strain of this mushroom in coastal Portugal.

See also
List of North American boletes

References

External links

Edible fungi
Boletales
Fungi described in 1787
Fungi of Asia
Fungi of Europe
Fungi of New Zealand
Fungi of North America